The de Muyser Lantwyck family is an old Belgian family dating back to the beginning of the 15th century, tracing its roots to Jean Moyser, alderman of Vaelbeek (duchy of Brabant), who held lands in Héverlé in 1451, censier of the Groenendael Priory, lord holding the lands and manor of Cockelberg by lease dated 19 June 1438, husband of Aleyde Crabbé.

History 
The son of Jean I, Gilles de Muyser, bought, in 1472, the manor of Hoff ten Rode in Bierbeek. His grandson, Jean II de Muyser, is son of Godefroid and brother of Pierre, is cited in 1494 and 1509 in the book of the fiefs of Héverlé as feudataire of Philippe de Croÿ, lord of Héverlé.

He married Ida de Lantwyck, daughter of Wautier before 1500. According to the aforementioned book of fiefs, Jean de Muyser died on 20 July 1531.

His descendants stayed in Vaalbeek, where the family remained, for every generation until the early 18th century, aldermen. These local offices were most likely given to the family as a souvenir of the lordship that was lost by Jean de Muyser's family. Indeed, a charter by Philip the Good dated to 1452 is kept at the Arenberg archives of the university of Louvain, tells us that Wautier de Lantwyck, father of Ida, definitively renounces in 1452, along with his siblings, all rights to the lordship of Vaalbeek that their father Jean was lord of until 1429. This lordship belonged to them through their grandfather, the knight Jean de Lantwyck, who had exchanged it for the lordship of Blanden. We know that the knight of Lanwyck, lord of Blanden, had sold the cense of half of the lordship of Blanden in 1388 to the Parc Abbey, but what happened to the other half remains a mystery.

Members 

Between the 15th and 18th centuries, Muyser's family gave two aldermen and a burgomaster to Vaalbeek as well as an alderman to Neervelp :

John II of Muyser, alderman of Vaalbeek
John III of Muyser, alderman of Vaalbeek
John IV of Muyser, burgomaster of Vaalbeek about 1636, collector of ordinance in 1639, alderman in 1642 and 1644 and dorpmeester in 1649
Pierre de Muyser, alderman of Neervelp, from 1753 to 1762

From the 19th to the 20th century: 

 Albert-Walther de Muyser (1870–1917), postmaster

From the 20th to the 21st century: 

Albert de Muyser (1920–2003), painter and racehorse owner

The Seven Noble Houses of Brussels 
The Seven Noble Houses of Brussels were the seven families of Brussels whose descendants formed the patrician class of that city, and to whom special privileges in the government of that city were granted until the end of the Ancien Régime.

The six houses from which the family descend :
House of Sweerts
House of Coudenbergh
House of Roodenbeke
House of Sleeus
House of Serhuyghs
House of Steenweeghs

Allied families 
  Poot family
  Coart family

Authority 
Content in this edit is translated from the existing French Wikipedia article at :fr:Famille de Muyser Lantwyck; see its history for attribution.

References

Further reading 

 Théodore de Renesse, Dictionnaire des figures héraldiques T.III, 1894–1903, see : Chat, Muyser, p. 12
 Frédéric Collon, Armorial de Wavre et environs, de LANTWYCK, Brussels, Librairia, 1952, in-12, pp. 92–93.
 Chanoine Jean Cassart, de LANTWIJCK, Essai d'une généalogie de cette famille du XVe au XVIIIe siècle, Brabantica, X, 1st part, 1971, pp. 163–210.
 François Schoonjans, Héraldique des familles lignagères : la famille Poot, 1977, 
 Michel de Muyser, Crayon généalogique de la famille de Muyser, in Le Parchemin, July – August 1987, 52nd year,  
 Recueil L de l'OGHB, Armorial Héraldique vivante (1974–2002), Genealogical and Heraldic Office of Belgium, p. 69.
 Laurette van Waesberghe, Genealogie van de familie van Waesberghe, 1995, p. 80
 Oscar Coomans de Brachène, État présent de la noblesse belge – 1st part Clo/Crom – Annuaire de 2005, p. 4
 Jean-François Houtart, OGHB, Anciennes familles de Belgique, 2008, p. 87
 Michel de Muyser Lantwyck, Autour du manoir Coeckelberghe à Vaalbeek, in Le Parchemin, July – August 2017, 82nd year,  

Belgian families
Ancient families
Seven Noble Houses of Brussels
House of Coudenbergh
House of Roodenbeke
House of Serhuyghs
House of Sweerts
House of Sleeus
House of Steenweeghs